Gerald Anthony Cadogan (born January 16, 1986, in Oakland, California) is an American football offensive tackle who is currently a free agent. He was signed by the Carolina Panthers as an undrafted free agent in 2009. He played college football at Penn State.

Cadogan has also been a member of the Cincinnati Bengals, San Diego Chargers, Philadelphia Eagles and the Indianapolis Colts.

Early years
Cadogan excelled in football at Portsmouth High School assisting the Trojans to multiple playoff appearances. Cadogan was a four-sport star at Portsmouth High School, lettering in football, track, swimming, and basketball. He was named first-team Associated Press All-State in football his senior season. The Youngstown Vindicator named Cadogan All-Conference twice. He was also an Ohio finalist for the Wendy's High School Heisman, and was the Portsmouth Daily Times Sportsman-of-the-Year.

He played in the 2004 Big 33 Football Classic and the Ohio North-South All-Star game.

College career
Gerald decided to attend Penn State.  After redshirting his freshman (2004) season, Cadogan worked his way to second on the depth chart at left tackle behind future first-round draft pick, Levi Brown in 2005. He earned Academic All-Big Ten honors that season.

Cadogan was switched to guard for the 2006 season, appearing in 11 games and helping tailback Tony Hunt compile the second of two 1,000-yard rushing seasons. He returned to his natural position of tackle in 2007, and started all 13 games for the Nittany Lions and earned first-team Academic All-America and Academic All-Big Ten honors that year.

Cadogan was a 2008 candidate for college football's prestigious Draddy Trophy, presented annually to the nation's top college football student-athlete. At season's end, he was named a consensus first-team All-Big Ten selection and was awarded the conference's Sportsmanship Award. He was also named an Academic All-American for a second time.

Professional career

Pre-draft
Cadogan was invited to the 2009 NFL Scouting Combine where he ran 4.99 in the 40-yard dash (fifth among offensive linemen at the combine).

Carolina Panthers
Despite most draft pundits projecting Cadogan to be selected in the third or fourth round of the 2009 NFL Draft, he was not selected at all. He signed with the Carolina Panthers on April 26, 2009. He was waived on August 31.

Cincinnati Bengals
Cadogan was signed to the Cincinnati Bengals practice squad on November 3. He was released on November 10.

San Diego Chargers
Cadogan was signed to the San Diego Chargers practice squad on November 19. He was released on December 5.

Philadelphia Eagles
Cadogan was signed to the Philadelphia Eagles' practice squad on December 8.

Indianapolis Colts
After his contract with the Eagles expired at season's end, Cadogan signed a future contract with the Indianapolis Colts on January 22, 2010. He was waived injured before training camp and released with an injury settlement.

Calgary Stampeders
Cadogan was signed to the Calgary Stampeders’ practice squad on October 21, 2010—prior to week 17 of the 2010 CFL season. 
 He was promoted to the active roster during 2011 training camp, and appeared in the Stamps’ first preseason game versus the BC Lions on June 15, 2011.  On September 13, 2011, Cadogan was released by the Stampeders.

Toronto Argonauts
On October 30, 2012, Cadogan signed with the Toronto Argonauts of the Canadian Football League, later winning the 100th Grey Cup.

After football
Cadogan returned to Portsmouth, where he teaches and coached the swimming and boys track teams and was an assistant football coach at Portsmouth High School, his alma mater. In July 2019, he was named the first-ever swimming coach at Shawnee State University, a NAIA school in Portsmouth.

Personal life
Cadogan is an avid musician, playing many instruments, singing and arranging songs. He began singing in the church choir at age four, and learned to play a slew of instruments in his youth, including the trumpet, trombone, piano, guitar, drums, oboe, and the euphonium. Cadogan played trumpet with his high school marching band, often while still wearing his football uniform during halftime shows. He once even conducted the Penn State Blue Band following a 2007 home victory at Beaver Stadium.

Cadogan has released two gospel albums. He also sang the national anthem a cappella at a 2008 State College campaign rally  for presidential candidate Barack Obama.

References

External links
Gerald Cadogan Profile, Penn State Department of Intercollegiate Athletics
"Cadogan poised to replace Levi Brown on Penn State line", USAToday", July 16, 2007
"Football and music are both important to lineman Gerald Cadogan", Frank Bodani, York Daily Record, August 25, 2008
Gerald Cadogan Singing at Penn State's Obama Rally, YouTube, March 30, 2008
"NFL Draft Prospect Interview: Gerald Cadogan, OT, Penn State", Paul Eide, thefootballexpert.com, February 16, 2009.
"PSU's Cadogan could be remedy at tackle", Tyler Dunne, BuffaloFootballReport.com, Mar 11, 2009.
"Cadogan keeping focus on football, not music", Darin Gantt, Enquirer-Herald'', June 10, 2009.

1986 births
Living people
Players of American football from Oakland, California
Players of American football from Ohio
People from Portsmouth, Ohio
American gospel singers
Gospel music composers
American football offensive tackles
Penn State Nittany Lions football players
Carolina Panthers players
Cincinnati Bengals players
San Diego Chargers players
Philadelphia Eagles players
Indianapolis Colts players
Calgary Stampeders players
21st-century American singers